Combat Zone Wrestling (CZW) is an American independent wrestling promotion. In 1998, John Zandig and five of his students, Ric Blade, T.C.K, Lobo, Nick Gage and Justice Pain, along with trainer Jon Dahmer, began to run professional wrestling shows in New Jersey and Delaware, showcasing a brand of hardcore wrestling dubbed as "ultraviolence". Ladders, tables, steel folding chairs, thumbtacks, barbed wire, weed whackers, light tubes, panes of glass, exploding barbed wire baseball bats, and fire are all common elements of "ultraviolent wrestling" in CZW. The company filled a niche for hardcore wrestling fans that had been left open by the folding of Extreme Championship Wrestling (ECW). CZW established themselves as the leading American hardcore wrestling promotion at the ECW Arena with their Cage of Death 3 show in 2001, the year ECW folded.

Their homegrown roster helped establish what became a top independent promotion in later years. Although they are most commonly known for their "ultraviolent" style, their shows feature almost every other style of wrestling as well. Just about any card will feature high flying, comedy, strong style, and technical wrestling. Their annual Tournament of Death show emphasizes the ultraviolent style of CZW, while their annual Best of the Best emphasizes on the technical and aerial style. CZW was broadcast on The Fight Network to viewers in the UK and Ireland as part of the Bloodbath program until The Fight Network closed in 2008. CZW used to run shows on a monthly basis at the Colossal Sports Academy in Voorhees Township, New Jersey. They formerly hosted events at the 2300 Arena in Philadelphia, Pennsylvania, the Flyers Skate Zone in Voorhees Township, New Jersey, and the Rastellies Kids Complex in Sewell, New Jersey. CZW currently runs monthly shows at The State Theatre in Havre de Grace, Maryland and at Studio Z in Blackwood, New Jersey.

In 2016, CZW was covered by Vice Media in the documentary Bloodlust: Tournament of Death.

History

John Zandig ownership

Pro Wrestling Academy 
Combat Zone Wrestling's Pro Wrestling Academy was founded in New Jersey by John Zandig in 1998. After training the classes alone, Zandig enlisted the help of Jon Dahmer, who helped train with Zandig for the next three classes. The first student trained was Lobo, who worked with Zandig before their wrestling careers. Nick Gage and Justice Pain were the next two students to be trained by Zandig. The fourth student and fifth student trained was TCK and Ric Blade. The academy relocated to The 2300 Arena in Philadelphia, Pennsylvania, and briefly merged with the Chikara Wrestle Factory. Shortly after the second class, the Academy separated from the Chikara Wrestle Factory and moved its operation back to New Jersey, then back to Philadelphia, and now to Blackwood, New Jersey. Previously, Drew Gulak was the head trainer of the academy, with members of the CZW locker room joining them every session. He later joined WWE in 2016.

Japan connection 
Early 2000 saw CZW establish a connection with the death match wrestling orientated company Big Japan Pro Wrestling, credited to have popularized the death match wrestling style that CZW continued to emphasize in the United States, dubbed as "Ultraviolence". Both promotions traded talent throughout 2000 and 2001, the company vs company feud was primarily based in Japan. The "CZW Warriors" in BJW included Wifebeater, Nick Gage, Trent Acid, Justice Pain, Johnny Kashmere, Nate Hatred, Ruckus, Nick Berk, as well as John Zandig as the leader.

Notable incidents included Zandig turning face in Japan and Jun Kasai joining Zandig as part of his Big Dealz stable in CZW. Kasai competed in a match which was later dubbed "Un F'N Believable," in reference to the shows name. During the match, Kasai was crucifix bombed over the top rope into light tubes, barbed wire and tables, causing Kasai's elbow bone to pop out of his skin, he continued the match after having his elbow taped up.

During 2001 in Japan, the Wifebeater and Ryuji Yamakawa faced off in a match which ended Yamakawa's career after the Wifebeater chokensteined him off the ring apron through a table set up on the outside. In a 'shoot interview' Wifebeater stated communication difficulties between the two was a major factor which led to the incident. Wifebeater pleaded that they should not execute the maneuver, though the move went on and saw Yamakawa's head slam against the concrete. Both wrestlers have stated that it was half of each other's fault when Yamakawa did not take the move as it should be performed; back first, though some even blame the Japanese tables, which are smaller, more sturdy and harder to break, the table in this incident did not break and simply slipped from underneath of Yamakawa thus only connecting with his legs, causing his head to take the impact on the concrete.

The reason for the collapse of the inter-promotional deal is uncertain. After a controversial exploding panes of glass match, between Zandig and Mitsuhiro Matsunaga in Japan, 2001, Zandig left BJW with the BJW death match title belt. Many wrestlers of both promotions at the time were confused about the collapse between the two.

Champs Arena, PPV, and Fake You TV 
In February 2000, the company would relocate from their home arena in Mantua Township, New Jersey, to Champs Soccer Arena, in Sewell, New Jersey. They would remain there for two years until the state of New Jersey banned the use of ultraviolent weapons (such as glass, barbed wire, and fire) in wrestling. To counteract the ban, CZW branched out from New Jersey to Delaware, where they would host their more ultraviolent shows throughout the rest of the company's existence.

A pay-per-view taping for the June 25, 2000, show, was put in place. The event was scheduled to be main evented by Terry Funk and Atsushi Onita in an explosion match, a rematch of their FMW 4th Anniversary Show encounter. The deal fell through when Onita canceled. Although the show took place and was main evented by Nick Gage and the Wifebeater in the first ever 200 light tubes match in the United States, the show was later called 'They Said it Couldn't be Done'.

On June 8, 2001, the company secured a TV taping for the show Take 1. During the main event as part of a dual 20 ft balcony dive, Ric Blade suffered a broken leg after landing on Justice Pain, who laid upon two stacked tables, Nick Gage was to attempt the second dive with Lobo a few meters away. Gage slipped and fell from atop the balcony to the ground, but was able to continue, unlike Blade who had to be stretchered out. The spot was cut from TV. The TV tapings aired on WGTW-48, as a part of CZW's very own show Fake You TV, which was available in many northeastern states in the US. After many business changes by the WGTW-48 production team over the years, including a time slot change from Saturdays at 9.00 pm to a weeknight at midnight slot, to compete with other promotions, this idea was a failure and Fake You TV continued to strive. CZW continued to endure every business decision that WGTW-48 formulated and executed until the channel decided not to air the June 18, 2004, episode due to its content, through negative effects on the fans and after much consideration, CZW decided to withdraw the show indefinitely.

Viking Hall debut and Indy Wars 
Due to their upcoming annual Cage Of Death 3 (COD) show at the end of 2001, the company needed a bigger venue and made their debut in the ECW Arena, formerly Viking Hall and currently The Arena. The venue was the first sellout in the building since the era of ECW, and hundreds were turned away from the biggest show in the promotion's history.

Several promotions competed for the Northeast fan base that had been left behind by ECW in what became known as the 'Indy Wars." CZW, XPW, and 3PW were the key promotions which revolved around Viking Hall. XPW were given the lease to the arena in very late 2002 after Rob Black offered around $60,000. On December 12, 2002, as part of a triple header of wrestling in Philadelphia Ring of Honor ran shows in conjunction with CZW and 3PW in what was to be the latter two promotions last events in the arena. During CZW's event, Zandig publicly stated that they had offered $32,000 to stay in the arena, but also stating that with the $10,000 a month XPW would need to pay for the building, the lease would not last long.

Accompanied by incidents relating to Extreme Associates, XPW later folded in 2003. CZW made their return to the arena on March 8, 2003.

ECW tribute and Italy 
Shortly after their return to the arena, on May 10, 2003, the company promoted a show entitled "Then & Now: A Decade of Defiance." The event was a tribute to the last ten years of wrestling in the New Alhambra Arena, or at the time; Viking Hall.

On October 25, 2003, the promotion made their debut in Italy with an attendance record of 2,000 people filled the Palasport Arena in Pistoia, later on March 27, 2004, the company returned for another event which featured Sabu in a tables match this time only drawing 500 people in Parma.

IWA-MS Invasion 
On June 14, 2003, mid-south based promotion Independent Wrestling Association Mid-South (IWA-MS) invaded CZW as part of a kayfabe angle which led to an inter-promotional feud throughout most of 2003. During the night of the initial invasion, the crowd was so riled up that they began hurling chairs into the ring at Ian Rotten, Corporal Robinson, and J. C. Bailey of IWA-MS. The Delaware wrestling commissioner, who was in the ring at the time, was struck in the side of the head. The feud was based in both promotions and a major part led into CZW's Tournament of Death 2, five IWA-MS wrestlers and three CZW wrestlers entered into the 8-man single elimination tournament. The semi-final saw two CZW wrestlers John Zandig and Nick Mondo compete in a 2 out of 3 light tube log cabin match, a match which is said to have ended Mondo's career (However, in Mondo's shoot interview he stated that T.O.D 2 was going to be his last appearance anyway). Towards the end of the match Zandig Mother F'N Bombed Mondo off a 40 ft rooftop as both men crashed into tables and a light tube log cabin contraption. Mondo continued the Tournament with 3 broken bones in his wrist and won the tournament after defeating Ian Rotten in a 200 light tubes final.

Zandig hanging incident 
During John Zandig's feud with heel stable the Hi-5, Zandig was suspended in the middle of the ring by meat hooks from the roof of the arena. The incident led into the setup of the main event at Cage of Death 2003, where a cage was suspended from the roof, the event was called Cage of Death 5: Suspended. The company remained successful that year and had a sold-out crowd for their annual Cage of Death show.

Last years of Zandig's ownership
During 2005, CZW established a connection with local promotion Chikara, which established into a joint training school known as 'The Wrestle Factory' in the New Alhambra Arena, with head trainers Chris Hero and Mike Quackenbush. During 2007, CZW departed from the training school to form their own, much like their older school.

The company remained strong in the forthcoming years with new booker, Mike Burns, who was responsible for one of the best runs in the promotion's history. Pancoast Productions, a company which for many years was responsible for a lot of CZW's logos and TitanTron work, among other things, briefly departed from the company in late 2005 after an altercation between Pancoast Productions owner Mike Pancoast and John Zandig.

At their Cage of Death 7 show at the end of 2005, former CZW Ironman Champion Chris Hero cut a promo challenging "American Dragon" Bryan Danielson to a match at the next show. Backstage during this promo, CZW owner John Zandig was furious. Zandig did not know of the deal that CZW booker, Mike Burns arranged with Ring of Honor (ROH) Booker, Gabe Sapolsky. The news of CZW working with ROH made Zandig go into a frenzy. Zandig was approached backstage by Mike Pancoast and after a very vocal argument Zandig pushed him down a flight of stairs. One worker quoted Zandig telling Pancoast, "Make sure to grab the rail on your way down."

D. J. Hyde ownership

Expansion and international partnerships
D. J. Hyde purchased CZW from Zandig in 2009. The first show booked by Hyde was Tangled Web 2. Since then, CZW has held its first shows in Germany, Massachusetts, Ohio, South Carolina and Indiana. They also returned to Japan and has brought back previous stars like Homicide, The Briscoe Brothers, Derek Frazier, and BJ Whitmer. In 2014 CZW toured England as part of a cross promotion with Tidal Championship Wrestling.

In January 2012, CZW & ECW's arena was sold and was later temporarily closed, not reopening until December 2013. The closing of the venue forced CZW to look for a new home, now running monthly events at Flyers Skate Zone in Voorhees, New Jersey. After 13 years in business together, in 2013 Combat Zone Wrestling and Smart Mark Home Video ceased partnership after a falling-out. As of February 2013 all Combat Zone Wrestling events are filmed, edited, and distributed by RF Video. On July 12, 2017, it was reported Dave Marquez had bought into Combat Zone Wrestling as part-owner of the company.

CZW also partners with other promotions like: wXw for their Germany promotions, CLW (Combat League Wrestling) for their Serbia promos and FMW, in a one-time match between Matt Tremont and Atsushi Onita.

GCW incident 
On December 9, 2017, CZW's Cage of Death 19 show ended with Nick Gage and Brett Lauderdale from rival promotion Game Changer Wrestling (GCW) invading the ring. Reportedly, CZW booker Giancarlo Dittamo had pitched an invasion angle to D. J. Hyde, but was shot down. Without telling anyone, Dittamo decided to go through with the angle regardless. Police were called to the arena, but Dittamo, Gage and Lauderdale had all left the venue by the time they arrived. Hyde was reportedly "beyond furious" over the incident, firing Dittamo from CZW.

CZW Studios 
CZW Studios is a video-on-demand service owned by Combat Zone Wrestling. In 2015, CZW signed a deal for pay-per-views on In Demand. All major CZW events air live on the service, which also features matches from the promotion's archives, dating back to 2002. The service has a current monthly subscription price of $9.99.

Annual Events

Cage of Death 

Combat Zone Wrestling's biggest show is the end of the year Cage of Death. It always features the "Cage of Death" match, a steel cage with various weapons, objects, and plenty of wrestling violence. Electrified cage walls, cacti, ladders, tables, steel folding chairs, barbed wire, light tubes, fire, glass, thumbtacks, and baseball bats have been used in it. Matches that also always include the high risk wrestling stunts and bumps. The Cage of Death also has different formats and stipulations: singles, tag team, or gauntlet.

Tournament of Death 

Combat Zone Wrestling's yearly death-match tournament features the use of fire, weed whackers, light tubes, and other weapons. Previous winners include Wifebeater (TOD 1 and 3), Nick Mondo (TOD 2), Necro Butcher (TOD 4), Nick Gage (TOD 5 & TOD vs. Gorefest), Drake Younger (TOD 6), Brain Damage (TOD: FF), Jimmy Havoc (TOD 7), and John Zandig who gave the trophy over to Thumbtack Jack who lost the Tournament of Death trophy at Best of the Best to D.J. Hyde (TOD 8). Due to the incidents at TOD 8 another event named TOD 8.5 Rewind took place in the same year which was won by Thumbtack Jack. Scotty Vortekz won TOD 9. Masada won TOD X, XI and TOD: Europe.

Best of the Best 

Combat Zone Wrestling's yearly tournament that differs from other CZW events in how it emphasizes athleticism more than the use of weapons. The Best of the Best tournament is, by design, a Junior Heavyweight Tournament. In 2005, however, the tournament was formatted as an open weight tournament. The next year, it returned to its original format. Previous winners include Winger, Trent Acid, B-Boy, Sonjay Dutt, Mike Quackenbush, Ruckus, Joker, Sabian, Egotistico Fantastico, Adam Cole and Sami Callihan in that order.

Deja Vu 
The first show featured a bloody barbed wire match between Zandig and Lobo. Since then the Deja Vu card has been held on an almost yearly basis.

Chri$ Ca$h Memorial Show 
As of 2005 Combat Zone Wrestling annually run a memorial tribute event to Christopher "Chri$ Ca$h" Bauman titled "Down with the Sickness" after Chri$ Ca$h's theme song from the band Disturbed. The show originally started as a double header afternoon show, with another CZW event taking place later in the evening. Many former CZW trainees have made appearances on past events, including longtime friend GQ, who has wrestled on all of the events.

Tangled Web 
Every year since 2008, CZW has held this event in which a barbed-wire "spiderweb" is used.

Dojo Wars 
CZW launched a developmental brand associated with their training school called Dojo Wars to showcase CZW prospects.

Limelight 
CZW’s secondary live show.

CZW Combine 
Wrestlers from across the country come to CZW to showcase their talent to earn a spot on the CZW main roster!

Championships

Current Champions

Defunct Championships

Sister promotion

Maven Bentley Association 

The Maven Bentley Association (MBA) is Combat Zone Wrestling's sister company, run by Maven Bentley. The MBA is the sole owner of the Maven Bentley character. It provides promoter services to independent wrestling companies as well as the character Maven Bentley for acting and other entertainment endeavors. Half of the roster are mainly from CZW. The MBA LLC has provided services for some of the top names in the wrestling business such as Ring of Honor (ROH), World Xtreme Wrestling (WXW), World Sumo League (WSL), and Total Nonstop Action Wrestling (TNA).

In 2007, CZW had a short lived feud with the MBA, who had been running amok in CZW for the past few months with the power-mad Bentley abusing his authority. Bentley "hired" a few of CZW's own wrestlers to help him take over the company. Those wrestlers included Diehard Dustin Lee, Scotty Vortekz, Brain Damage, and D. J. Hyde. Bentley himself got involved as he was scheduled to face Lobo in a lumberjack strap match, which he lost at Cage of Death 9. The MBA returned to the CZW Arena for its "Economic Crisis" event on January 31, 2009.

Championships

See also 
 Big Japan Pro Wrestling
 Westside Xtreme Wrestling
 IWA-MS
 CZW Hall of Fame
 Game Changer Wrestling
 Independent wrestling

References

External links 

 
 Results from past CZW shows
 Profile on Wrestlingdata.com
 Official Instagram of Combat Zone Wrestling

 
American independent professional wrestling promotions based in Pennsylvania
Entertainment companies established in 1998
Professional wrestling in Philadelphia